Eddie Berry may refer to:
Eddie Berry (pitcher) (1918–1981), American Negro Leagues pitcher
Eddie Berry (shortstop), American Negro Leagues shortstop